TUI Travel PLC was a British leisure travel group headquartered in Crawley, West Sussex. The company was formed on 3 September 2007 by the merger of First Choice Holidays PLC and the Tourism Division of TUI AG, which owned 56.4%. The company operated in 180 countries and claimed 30 million customers.

The company was listed on the London Stock Exchange, and was a constituent of the FTSE 100 Index. TUI Travel merged with its German parent in 2014 to form the TUI Group.

History

TUI AG
The company was founded in 1923 in Berlin, Germany as Preußische Bergwerks und Hütten-Aktiengesellschaft operating in the industrial sector. In 1959 it listed on the Frankfurt Stock Exchange and in 1964 was renamed Preussag. In 2000 it acquired Thomson Travel and in 2002 bought Hapag Lloyd, which itself owned the travel firm TUI (formerly Touristik Union International), and renamed itself TUI AG. In June 2014 TUI AG and TUI Travel announced the two companies would be merged.

First Choice

The company was founded in 1973 as Owners Abroad operating as a travel agent. It first listed on the London Stock Exchange in 1982. In 1987 it launched Air 2000 and in 1990 acquired Redwing.

Merger
In March 2007, the merger of the travel division of TUI AG with First Choice was announced. The European Commission approved the merger on 4 June 2007, on the condition that the merged company sell Budget Travel in Ireland. The merged company, TUI Travel PLC, began operations in September 2007.

TUI and First Choice's in-house airlines, Thomsonfly and First Choice Airways, were brought together under the former's Air operator's certificate in May 2008, and the merged airline was rebranded as Thomson Airways in November 2008.

In October 2011 it was announced that under a two-year rebranding programme, the store estate would be rebranded as "Thomson featuring First Choice" to create a single travel agency brand; the First Choice branding and uniform will be phased out, and the First Choice name will be used for all-inclusive package holidays sold by the combined network.

The company confirmed in January 2013 that it had received a proposal from its parent to merge. In May 2013, the chief executive of TUI AG ruled out a merger with TUI Travel. In an about-face in June 2014 the two companies announced they had agreed terms on a merger. The merger was completed and TUI Travel was de-listed from the London Stock Exchange on 17 December 2014.

Selloffvacations.com

The online travel retailer was sold along with Signature Vacations to Sunwing Travel Group in 2009.

Operations
The Company was organised into three sectors:
 Mainstream
 Central Europe
 Northern Europe
 Western Europe
 Specialist and Activity

Airlines

In 2005 the names and liveries of the group airlines were changed to reflect the name of the group. The airlines were rebranded with the name best known in their local market or the name of the principal tour operator, Jet4you and Britannia Airways names were changed. Jet4you acquired the suffix "-fly" whereas Britannia Airways had a complete name change, to reflect the tour operator that it was flying for therefore Britannia Airways became Thomsonfly. Following the merger of First Choice Airways and Thomsonfly, the new combined airline became Thomson Airways. Both airlines had their aircraft repainted in the light blue TUI colours with a red TUI logo on the tail. However, Corsairfly has been renamed Corsair International and has a new livery.

Airlines before merger

Former airlines

References

External links

 Corporate website

TUI Group
Travel and holiday companies of the United Kingdom
British companies established in 2007
British companies disestablished in 2014
Hospitality companies established in 2007
Hospitality companies disestablished in 2014
Holding companies established in 2007
Holding companies disestablished in 2014
Companies formerly listed on the London Stock Exchange
Companies based in Crawley
Airline holding companies
Holding companies of the United Kingdom
2007 establishments in England
2014 disestablishments in England